Meda may refer to:

Places
 Meda de Mouros, a parish in Tábua Municipality, Portugal
 Medas, a parish in Gondomar Municipality, Portugal
 Meda-Ela, Sri Lanka
 Međa (Leskovac), village in the municipality of Leskovac, Serbia
 Meda, Lombardy, city in the Province of Monza and Brianza, Italy
 Mêda Municipality, Portugal
 Meda, Oregon, United States
 Meda River, Western Australia
 Meda, Togo
 Međa (Žitište), village in the municipality of Žitište, Serbia

People
 Alberto Meda, Italian industrial designer
 Bianca Maria Meda (1665–1700), Italian composer
 Giuseppe Meda (1534–1599), Italian painter, architect and hydraulics engineer
 Igor Meda (born 1967), Russian footballer
 Jack Meda, Canadian boxer
 Meda of Odessos (fl. 336 BC), Thracian princess
 Meda Chesney-Lind (born 1947), American criminologist
 Meda McKenzie (born 1963), New Zealand swimmer
 Meda Mládková (born 1919), Czech art collector
 Meda Ryan, Irish historian

Other uses
 A. C. Meda 1913, Italian football club based in Meda, Lombardy
 HMS Meda, vessels of the Royal Navy
 MEDA, a psychedelic drug
 Meda AB,  a Swedish pharmaceutical company
 Meda (fish), a monotypic genus of cyprinid fish
 Meda (mythology), name of several female figures in Greek mythology
 SC Mêda, a football club based in Mêda Municipality, Portugal